Albert Geouffre de Lapradelle, LL.D. (1871-1955) was a French jurisconsult, born in Tulle.  He taught in Grenoble and in Paris.  He published numerous works on international questions, such as disarmament, rights over territorial waters, and the international aspects of the Monroe Doctrine.  In 1905, he joined with Professor Politis in the production of Recueils des arbitrages internationaux.  In 1914 he was French exchange professor at Columbia, which gave him the degree of LL.D. He created the Institute of Higher International Studies. His writings include:  
 Théories et pratiques des fondations (1894)  
 La mer territoriale (1898)  
 La conférence de la Paix (1899)  
 La question du désarmament (1899)  
 La question du Maroc (1904)  
 La guerre maritime et le droit des gens (1908)

References
Whose International Community? Universalism and the Legacies of Empire; Columbia Department of History, April 2005

External links
 

French diplomats
20th-century French essayists
20th-century French non-fiction writers
1871 births
1955 deaths
People from Tulle
French male essayists
20th-century French male writers